This is a list of settlements in Lincolnshire by population based on the results of the 2011 census. The next United Kingdom census will take place in 2021. In 2011, there were 28 built-up area subdivisions with 5,000 or more inhabitants in Lincolnshire, shown in the table below.

List of settlements 

Notes:
The Office of National Statistics (ONS) subdivide built-up areas into sectors which do not respect administrative or political boundaries. If those areas have a strong city/town/village identity, for population purposes they are classed into a separate area.

See also 

 List of places in Lincolnshire
 List of civil parishes in Lincolnshire

External links
 Link to ONS built up area statistics

References 

 
Settlements
Lincolnshire